Collective Oregon Eateries (CORE) is a food cart pod in Portland, Oregon, United States.

History
Hanry Ho and Mandy Kao opened CORE on June 5, 2021. They had originally planned to open in 2018.

Businesses have included:

 BKK Pad Thai
 Breakside Brewing
 Chicken and Guns (closed in July 2021)
 The Drip'n Crab
 From Russia with Love
 Heyday
 Jas Kitchen
 Kai's Stir Fry
 Mitate
 Papi Sal's
 Shawarma Express
 Shark's Cove
 Sou's
 Summit Shack

References

External links

 
 

2021 establishments in Oregon
Food carts in Portland, Oregon
Lents, Portland, Oregon